Thomas Percy, Earl of Worcester, KG (134323 July 1403) was an English medieval nobleman and naval commander best known for leading the rebellion with his nephew Henry Percy, known as 'Harry Hotspur', and his elder brother, Henry Percy, 1st Earl of Northumberland.

Lineage
He was the younger son of Henry de Percy, 3rd Baron Percy, and Mary, daughter of Henry, 3rd Earl of Lancaster, who descended from Henry III of England. He was the younger brother of Henry Percy, 1st Earl of Northumberland. Percy never married or had children. He was the great-great grandson of Henry III of England.

Career
Worcester fought against England's traditional enemy France in the Hundred Years' War, and then served in various important governing posts in English-controlled France, as Ambassador, Seneschal. He was appointed Admiral of the North from 26 Jan 1384–22 February 1385. In the 1390s he built Wressle Castle. He was created Earl of Worcester in 1397 by King Richard II. In 1399 he was appointed Admiral of the Kings Fleet in Ireland.

Close to the crown
Along with his brother and nephew, he took part in Henry IV's deposition of Richard II. He is said to have broken the staff of office symbolizing his position as Richard II's steward when declaring for the revolt. Later, in turn, he took part in the Percies' own subsequent rebellion against King Henry IV. He is said to have negotiated with Henry IV before the Battle of Worcester and then misrepresented King Henry's offer for a settlement to persuade his nephew Henry "Hotspur" to reject the offer and fight the battle.

Capture and execution
He was captured at the Battle of Shrewsbury and publicly beheaded in Shrewsbury two days later, on 23 July 1403. He was buried in St. Peter's, Shrewsbury, Shropshire, England. His head was displayed in London on London Bridge.

Fictional portrayals

He appears in Shakespeare's Henry IV, Part 1 as the main plotter of the 1403 rebellion.

Ancestry

References

1343 births
1403 deaths
14th-century English Navy personnel
15th-century English Navy personnel
Thomas
Younger sons of barons
Percy
English admirals
Knights of the Garter
People executed under the Lancastrians
People executed under the Plantagenets by decapitation
Male Shakespearean characters
Lord High Admirals of England
Peers created by Richard II